Jaya Jaya Mahārāṣṭra Mājhā ("Victory to My Maharashtra!") is the official song of Maharashtra. It Is Marathi patriotic song praising the Indian state of Maharashtra. The original lyrics of the song were written by Raja Badhe. The music was composed by Shrinivas Khale and sung by folk singer Krishnarao Sable, popularly known as Shahir Sable.
The song is widely used and played in the official functions of Maharashtra Government .

Traditional version

Original lyrics

New version

The song with alterations in music and lyrics was released in 2004 in the album Dilse Maratha Hai by singer and composer Avdhoot Gupte. The album was released by president of Shiv Sena Uddhav Thackeray at the Thackeray residence "Matoshri", Bandra, in Mumbai. The video featured actors Urmila Matondkar and Vivek Oberoi. Gupte's song however is a mix of Hindi and Marathi. The music is inspired from Bryan Adam's chartbuster song Summer of '69. 
 
The new version faced some criticism for the use of swear words considered inappropriate in the song. In defense Gupte said that they were added "to make it peppy".

Notes

References

External links
 Listen to the song in official youtube video, https://www.youtube.com/watch?v=LKZYuaZ_rxc
 Listen to the original Marathi song at https://web.archive.org/web/20110723133555/http://www.geetsargam.net/php_pages2/jukebox.php?songID=811
 Lyrics and Info at Aathavanitli Gani - http://www.aathavanitli-gani.com/Song/Jay_Jay_Maharashtra_Majha
 Listen to Houston Maharashtra Mandal's Version of the Jai Jai Maharashra Song - https://www.youtube.com/watch?v=w_iVavaqzis

Marathi-language songs
Year of song missing
Indian state songs